Dominica requires its residents to register their motor vehicles and display vehicle registration plates. Current plates are North American standard 6 × 12 inches (152 × 300 mm). Vehicles have black on white plates (front and rear) or black on white (front) and black on yellow (rear) plates. The first letter of the license plate identifies the type of vehicle it is. P identifies Private Vehicle.

References

Dominica
Transport in Dominica
Dominica transport-related lists